William Bennett Goodacre (26 February 1873 – 29 June 1948) was an English first-class cricketer active 1898–1903 who played for Nottinghamshire. He was born in Nottingham; died in Sproxton, Leicestershire.

References

1873 births
1948 deaths
English cricketers
Nottinghamshire cricketers